The Angola blind snake (Afrotyphlops angolensis) is a species of snake in the Typhlopidae family. While named after its type locality in Angola, it is widespread in Central and East Africa. Specifically, it is found in Angola, northern Zambia, the Democratic Republic of the Congo, the Republic of the Congo, Gabon, Cameroon, the Central African Republic, Tanzania, Uganda, and Kenya.

References

angolensis
Snakes of Africa
Reptiles of Angola
Reptiles of Cameroon
Reptiles of the Central African Republic
Reptiles of the Democratic Republic of the Congo
Reptiles of Gabon
Reptiles of Kenya
Reptiles of the Republic of the Congo
Reptiles of Tanzania
Reptiles of Uganda
Reptiles of Zambia
Reptiles described in 1866
Taxa named by José Vicente Barbosa du Bocage